Yi Cheol-seung (Hangul:이철승, Hanja:李哲承; May 15, 1922 – February 27, 2016) was a South Korean 7-term National Assemblyman (lawmaker, conservative) and a founding father of the Republic of Korea after the Korean War (1950–1953). A political heavyweight, Lee was an independence and democracy fighter and leader; anti-communism; anti-military rule; anti-Japanese rule; an advocate of bipartisanship particularly when it came to national security; and an advocate of non-governmental organizations. After Korea was liberated from Japanese colonial rule in 1945, Lee "led a student union that opposed a trusteeship, under which Korea would be governed by foreign powers after World War II, and entered politics in 1954 after winning a parliamentary seat." Lee, and his two political rivals former Presidents Kim Young-sam and Kim Dae-jung, were famous for their political competition and the establishment and development of democracy in South Korea. He was given an honorable burial for his life contributions at the Seoul National Cemetery on March 2, 2016, where former South Korean presidents are also buried.

Early life and education
 1949 – B.A. in Political Science, Korea University
 1962 – Studied at the Graduate School of the University of Pennsylvania in International Relations
 1995 – Honorary Doctor in Literature from Woosuk University
 1998 – Honorary Doctor in Political Science from Korea University

Political Career

Independence Activist
1946 
 Chairman, Central Committee, Anti-Trustee Students Assembly
 Chairman, Central Committee, National Students Assembly

National Assembly
1954
 Member, The 3rd National Assembly(Jeonju, Independent)
1958~1961
 Member, The 4th National Assembly(Jeonju, Democratic Party)
 The 5th National Assembly(Jeonju, Democratic Party)
1961
 Korean Delegate to the 15th U.N. General Assembly
 Chairman, Korea Sports Council
 President, Korea Weightlifting Federation
1966
 Chairman, Asia Weightlifting Federation
1969
 Chairman, Asia Weightlifting Federation
1971~1973
 Member, The 8th National Assembly(Jeonju, New Democratic Party)
 Chairman, Korean Policy Research Institute
1973
 Member, The 9th National Assembly(Jeonju, New Democratic Party)
 Vice Speaker of the National Assembly
1975
 Korean Delegate to the 30th U.N. General Assembly
1976
 Representative Supreme Member, New Democratic Party
1978
 Member, The 10th National Assembly(Jeonju, Wanju, New Democratic Party)
1984~
 President, Council for Commemorative Projects for Korea's Anti-trusteeship & Anti-communism Student's Movement
1985
 Member, The 12th National Assembly(Jeonju, New Democratic Party)
1987
 자유민주총연맹 총재

Political Exile
On May 16, 1961, Park Chung-hee, Kim Jong-pil, and Lee Nak-sun successfully staged a military coup d'etat. Immediately after, Park Chung-hee sent aides to try and win over key opposition lawmakers including Lee who rejected Park's request for help. Lee was forced to leave politics and went to the United States where he was vocally opposed to the military coup in Korea and studied Political Science at the University of Pennsylvania.

(This article needs more details about his political exile, his "man without a passport" status, and his asylum in the U.S.)

Political Comeback
(This article needs more details about his political comeback)

Post-Political Career and Civil Society Leadership
1990
 Director, The Seoul Peace Prize
 Member, The Seoul Peace Prize Selection Committee
1993
 Director, Commemorative Committee for "Patriotic Martyr in Yeosoon"
1994~
 Co-chairman, National Council for Freedom and Democracy
1995~
 Advisor, Korea Eligible Senior Voters Federation
1996~
 Chairman, Seoul Peace Prize Cultural Foundation and President, the Seoul Peace Prize Selection Committee
 Member, Organizing Committee for the 2002 World Cup
 Chairman, Association of Patriotic Societies for National Foundation
1998
 Chairman, Preparatory Committee for Commemorative of the Founding of the Republic of Korea
2005
 자유민주비상국민회의 대표의장
2007
 Chairman, Parliamentarians' Society of the Republic of Korea
2011~2016
 Chairman, The Elders Group of the Parliamentarians' Society of the Republic of Korea

Death
Lee died on February 27, 2016, at 03:45 KST, at Samsung Hospital in Seoul at the age of 94. A funeral was held for him on March 2, 2016, that began with a five-day wake and a police-escorted procession that led to the National Assembly and ended with a gun salute at the Seoul National Cemetery where he is buried along with former South Korean presidents.

Awards
 Order of Service Merit ("Mugunghwa Medal," Hangul: 국민훈장무궁화장)

Publications
 The Republic of Korea and I (대한민국과 나) (2011)
 Oh! Who Will Look After Korea (Hangul: 오! 대한민국 누가 지키리) (2002)
 A Challenge for Hopelessness (Hangul: 절망에의 도전)
 Long March to Democracy (Hangul: 민주의 장정)
 Pan-National Student Federation (Hangul: 전국학련)
 The Middle-of-the-Road Integration Theory (Hangul: 중도통합론) (1992)
 The Sound Argument of Chaotic Period
 A History of Korean Students National-Building Movement
 How the Republic of Korea was Founded (1998)
 My Political Thoughts for Democratic Development

See also
 Kim Gu
 Kim Kyu-sik
 Kim Seong-su
 Syngman Rhee

References

External links
 Lee Chul-seung: National Assembly of South Korea
 이철승 "민족지도자를 친일파로…" 동아일보 2005년 1월 26일자 기사 
 '건국60돌-헌정60돌' 이철승 헌정회장 인터뷰 동아일보 2008년 04월 02일자 
  중앙일보 2011년 05월 24일자 
 한국 현대사증언 TV자서전:이철승 1부 – 일제 식민지와 해방 

1922 births
2016 deaths
Anti-Japanese sentiment in Korea
Korean independence activists
South Korean anti-communists
South Korean democracy activists
Korean revolutionaries
South Korean Methodists
South Korean civil rights activists
South Korean journalists
Korean religious leaders
Democratic Party (South Korea, 1955) politicians
People from North Jeolla Province
Ramon Magsaysay Award winners
Members of the National Assembly (South Korea)